Uragami Gyokudō　or Urakami Gyokudō (浦上玉堂 1745, Kamogata, Okayama - October 10, 1820) was a Japanese musician, painter, poet and calligrapher.  In his lifetime, he was best known as a player of the Chinese seven-string zither, the guqin, but people came to appreciate his paintings after his death. His art features strong brushwork, often in patterns of strokes that build up a strong rhythm, and they reflect his musical compositions in relying on a limited number of possibilities that build up to powerful compositions. His Snow Sifted Through Frozen Clouds (紙本墨画凍雪篩雲図 shihon bokuga tōunshisetsuzu) is recognized as a National Treasure.

After working as a samurai for the Ikeda daimyō, he left his position for ideological reasons to devote himself to travel and the arts. He named his sons ""Spring Qin" and "Autumn Qin."  Gyokudō was expert in calligraphy, featuring clerical and running scripts, and he was a fine poet in Chinese.

One of his music works, the Gyokudō kinpu 玉堂琴譜, is available online

An excerpt is available Uragami Gyokudō and the chinese zither guqin based on the book Tall Mountains and Flowing Waters; The Arts of Uragami Gyokudō by Stephen Addiss, Univ. of Hawaii Press, 1987, .

References

External links
Bridge of dreams: the Mary Griggs Burke collection of Japanese art, a catalog from The Metropolitan Museum of Art Libraries (fully available online as PDF), which contains material on Uragami Gyokudō (see index)

1745 births
1820 deaths
18th-century Japanese musicians
18th-century male musicians
19th-century Japanese male musicians
Japanese calligraphers
Japanese male musicians
Japanese painters
Japanese poets
Artists from Okayama Prefecture